Pseudathyma lucretioides is a butterfly in the family Nymphalidae. It is found in Kenya and Tanzania. The habitat consists of forests.

Subspecies
Pseudathyma lucretioides lucretioides (coast of Kenya)
Pseudathyma lucretioides rondo Kielland, 1987 (Tanzania)

References

Butterflies described in 1950
Pseudathyma
Butterflies of Africa